Cerego is an adaptive learning technology platform based on principles of neuroscience and cognitive science.  Cerego's patented technology uses the scientific methods of distributed practice and the testing effect as the basis of user memory retention for content built in and available on their website.

Cerego has partnered and collaborated with various organizations and institutions including The Bill & Melinda Gates Foundation, EdX, Cengage and Fabien Cousteau’s Mission 31.

In 2009, Cerego launched a new Facebook app called Smart.fm Brainspeed that scans the information in the profiles of the user's friends and then creates a quiz around their personal information, in order to assess the memory power of the users.

In 2013, Cerego partnered with Elsevier to provide nursing and healthcare students an adaptive learning solution for their educational content.

In 2014, Cerego was awarded a grant by the Bill & Melinda Gates Foundation to provide next-generation digital courseware designed to reach more than 1 million low-income students and disadvantaged learners in undergraduate courses by 2018.

Preliminary results from a study conducted at Excelsior College in 2014 indicated that using Cerego can help increase grades when studying math and biology online.

References

External links
 Cerego's Official website

Spaced repetition software
American educational websites
Technology companies based in the San Francisco Bay Area